Zombies and Shit is a zombie filled Bizarro fiction written by Carlton Mellick III and was released in 2010 by the publishing company Eraserhead Press.

Plot 
A large group people awaken in the middle of a post apocalyptic type wasteland with no recollection of how they got there. Each person is equipped with a backpack of supplies and an odd weapon. The group soon finds out that they are a part of a reality show known as Zombies and Shit and their objective is to get to the rescue zone where there will be a helicopter waiting to take them to safety. This island is crawling with zombies that are there for the sole purpose of feasting on their flesh. It soon becomes apparent to the group that there is only one seat available on the helicopter. Zombies will not be the only things trying to stop them from reaching the rescue zone alive as soon they will have to turn on each other.

Shaun of The Dead meets Battle Royale in this over the top, action packed, and all out bloody gore fest of a battle for survival.

Reception 
Matthew J. Barbour of Horror Novel Reviews gave it a 5 out of 5 saying "For fans and those interested in bizarro literature, Zombies and Shit is a must read."

Goodreads, the social book cataloging website, has it rated a 4.15 out of 5 based on 702 ratings.

Currently holds a 4.15 out of 5 rating based on 698 reviews on the UK based online bookstore Book Depository

LibraryThing, the  social cataloging web application for books, has a rating of 4.3 out of 5 based on 65 reviews.

References 

2010 American novels
Zombies
Horror books